The Naval Officer-in-Charge, Aden, was an administrative appointment of British Royal Navy originally established in 1839 as the Senior Naval Officer, Aden. He was responsible for HMS Sheba. It was a sub-command of the Flag Officer, Middle East.

History
In 1839 the Royal Navy carried out an operation called the Aden Expedition led by Captain Henry Smith under orders from the Commander-in-Chief, East Indies, in the south east Arabian Peninsula its occupation of Aden was mainly for strategic reasons as Aden provided control of the entrance to the Red Sea a naval base was first established here at the same time.  In 1869 the Suez Canal was opened and the British Empire established  a number of protectorates in Southern Arabia mainly as a shield against further expansion by the Ottoman Empire who were occupying the rest of Yemen. In the 19th century and early twentieth century it was a major coaling station that sat on an important trade route from India. During World War Two the main naval formation based in Aden was the Red Sea Force.

In command before the First World War

Senior Naval Officer, Aden

Senior Naval Officer, Aden Division

Naval Transport Officer in Charge

In command inter-war period and Second World War

Naval Officer-in-Charge, Aden

References

Sources
 Anderson, Ewan W. (2014). Global Geopolitical Flashpoints : an Atlas of Conflict. London, England: Taylor and Francis, Routledge. .
 Bertke, Donald A.; Kindell, Don; Smith, Gordon (2011). WORLD WAR II SEA WAR: FRANCE FALLS, BRITAIN STANDS ALONE: Day-to-Day Naval Actions from April 1940 through September 1940. Lulu Bertke Publishing. .
 Campbell, Gwyn (10 January 2018). Bondage and the environment in the Indian Ocean world. New York, NY, USA: Springer Publishing. p. 248. 
 Clowes, W. Laird (William Laird); Markham, Clements R. (Clements Robert); Mahan, A. T. (Alfred Thayer); Wilson, Herbert Wrigley.(1897–1903) The royal navy, a history from the earliest times to present. London : S. Low, Marston, Co.
  "Flag Officers in Commission". The Navy List. London, England: H. M.Stationery Office. October 1944.
 Fevyer, W. H.; Wilson, J. W. (2012). Africa General Service Medal: to the Royal Navy and the Royal Marines. Luton, England: Andrews UK Limited. .
  Harley, Simon; Lovell, Tony (21 August 2018). "Aden - The Dreadnought Project". www.dreadnoughtproject.org. Harley and Lovell. Retrieved 1 October 2018.
  Houterman, J.N. "Royal Navy (RN) Officers 1939-1945 - S". www.unithistories.com. Houterman and Koppes. 
 Innes-Robbins, Simon (2018). "A Short History Of The Aden Emergency". Imperial War Museums. London, England: Imperial War Museums. Retrieved 1 October 2018.
  Niehorster, Leo. "World War II unit histories & officers". www.unithistories.com. L. Niehorster. Retrieved 3 July 2018.
 Ram, Krishnamurthy Venkat (2009). "Conclusion". Anglo-Ethiopian Relations, 1869 to 1906: A Study of British Policy in Ethiopia. New Delhi, India: Concept Publishing Company. .

A
Military units and formations established in 1839
Military units and formations disestablished in 1959